Schoenolaena is a monotypic genus of flowering plants belonging to the family Apiaceae. The sole species is Schoenolaena juncea.

Its native range is Southwestern Australia.

References

Mackinlayoideae
Monotypic Apiaceae genera
Taxa named by Alexander von Bunge